|

Jude Monye (born 16 November 1973) is a Nigerian athlete who specializes in the 400 metres. He is of Onicha-Ugbo, Delta State of Nigeria origin. Monye came to the United States to attend Mississippi State University, where he obtained a degree in geology. While attending school, he won the diversity visa lottery and was allowed to become a legal permanent resident of the United States. He became a citizen on 20 February 2004.

His personal best is 45.16, set during the 1995 World Championships in Athletics where he reached the semi final. The same year he won a bronze medal at the All-Africa Games. Monye was a part of the Nigerian team that won the silver medal in the 4 x 400 metres relay at the 2000 Olympics. He also competed in the individual contest, but was knocked out in the heats.

Olympics Controversy
During the 2000 Olympics, the American team won the gold medal, with the Nigerian team finishing second. However, Antonio Pettigrew acknowledged that he had used performance-enhancing drugs, along with two other members of the relay team and was therefore stripped of their medal. The awards were not immediately reallocated to the runners-up Nigeria that Monye raced on, despite the likelihood of it.

On 21 July 2012, the 2000 Olympics 4 × 400 m relay medals were reallocated after the USA team was stripped of the gold medal, meaning Monye and Nigeria are the gold medalists.

Personal Bests

References

External
 

Nigerian male sprinters
1973 births
Living people
Athletes (track and field) at the 1994 Commonwealth Games
Athletes (track and field) at the 1996 Summer Olympics
Athletes (track and field) at the 2000 Summer Olympics
Olympic athletes of Nigeria
World Athletics Championships medalists
Nigerian emigrants to the United States
Medalists at the 2000 Summer Olympics
Olympic gold medalists for Nigeria
Olympic gold medalists in athletics (track and field)
Olympic silver medalists in athletics (track and field)
African Games bronze medalists for Nigeria
African Games medalists in athletics (track and field)
Commonwealth Games competitors for Nigeria
Athletes (track and field) at the 1995 All-Africa Games
20th-century Nigerian people